The Wolfram Demonstrations Project is an organized, open-source collection of small (or medium-sized) interactive programmes called Demonstrations, which are meant to visually and interactively represent ideas from a range of fields. It is hosted by Wolfram Research, whose stated goal is to bring computational exploration to a large population. At its launch, it contained 1300 demonstrations but has grown to over 10,000. The site won a Parents' Choice Award in 2008.

Technology
The Demonstrations run in Mathematica 6 or above and in Wolfram CDF Player which is a free modified version of Wolfram's Mathematica  and available for Windows, Linux and macOS and can operate as a web browser plugin.

They typically consist of a very direct user interface to a graphic or visualization, which dynamically recomputes in response to user actions such as moving a slider, clicking a button, or dragging a piece of graphics. Each Demonstration also has a brief description of the concept.

Demonstrations are now easily embeddable into any website or blog. Each Demonstration page includes a snippet of JavaScript code in the Share section of the sidebar.

Topics
The website is organized by topic: for example, science, mathematics, computer science, art, biology, and finance. They cover a variety of levels, from elementary school mathematics to much more advanced topics such as quantum mechanics and models of biological organisms.  The site is aimed at both educators and students, as well as researchers who wish to present their ideas to the broadest possible audience.

Process
Wolfram Research's staff organizes and edits the Demonstrations, which may be created by any user of Mathematica, then freely published and freely downloaded. The Demonstrations are open-source, which means that they not only demonstrate the concept itself but also show how to implement it.

Alternatives
The use of the web to transmit small interactive programs is reminiscent of Sun's Java applets, Adobe's Flash, and the open-source Processing. However, those creating Demonstrations have access to the algorithmic and visualization capabilities of Mathematica making it more suitable for technical demonstrations. 

The Demonstrations Project also has similarities to user-generated content websites like Wikipedia and Flickr.  Its business model is similar to Adobe's Acrobat and Flash strategy of charging for development tools but providing a free reader.

References

External links 
Official site

Mathematics websites
Mathematics literature
Mathematics education
Open educational resources
Physics education
Wolfram Research